Louis Alfred Wiltz (January 21, 1843 – October 16, 1881) was an American politician from the state of Louisiana. He served as 29th Governor of Louisiana from 1880 to 1881 and before that time was mayor of New Orleans, lieutenant governor of Louisiana, and a member of the Louisiana House of Representatives.

Biography
Wiltz was born on January 21, 1843 in New Orleans to J.B. Theophile Wiltz and the former Louise Irene Villanueva. His paternal family were among the first German settlers in Louisiana and his mother came from a noble Spanish family, her father coming to Louisiana with the Spanish Army. He attended public school until the age of 15, when he began work with Plauche and Company. After the company failed, Wiltz became the clerk for the Second District Court of Louisiana.  With the outbreak of the American Civil War, Wiltz joined the Confederate States Army as a private but quickly rose to the rank of captain. In 1863, Wiltz married Micael Bienvenu of St. Martinville, the seat of St. Martin Parish. They had four daughters and one son.

In 1868, Wiltz was elected to the Louisiana House of Representatives and the New Orleans School Board. In 1872, he was elected mayor but could not take office until January 1873 because of the refusal of the Republican mayor to vacate the office. In addition to serving two years as mayor, Wiltz was once again elected to the Louisiana House of Representatives and served as lieutenant governor. He was succeeded by E. D. Estilette.

With the implementation of the new Louisiana state constitution of 1879, the gubernatorial term of Francis T. Nicholls was cut short by one year.  An election was held in 1879, and Louis Wiltz easily defeated his Republican opponent. Wiltz's term as governor was one rife with corruption. The corrupt Louisiana Lottery continued to have influence over the state legislature.  The state treasurer, Edward A. Burke, embezzled state funds while the public schools were neglected, and black disenfranchisement continued.

Wiltz died of tuberculosis while in office on October 16, 1881, in New Orleans.  Lieutenant Governor Samuel D. McEnery, a fellow Democrat, succeeded Wiltz.

See also 
 List of minority governors and lieutenant governors in the United States

References

External links
State of Louisiana – Biography
Kendall's History of New Orleans, Chapter 22: Wiltz
New Orleans Public Library page
 
 

1843 births
1881 deaths
American people of German descent
American people of Spanish descent
Hispanic and Latino American state governors of the United States
Democratic Party governors of Louisiana
Lieutenant Governors of Louisiana
Mayors of New Orleans
Speakers of the Louisiana House of Representatives
Democratic Party members of the Louisiana House of Representatives
19th-century deaths from tuberculosis
Tuberculosis deaths in Louisiana
19th-century American politicians